Godfrey-Proctor, (Godfrey and Proctor), was a British car manufacturer (circa late 1920s-1928) founded by Henry Ronald Godfrey (H.R. Godfrey) and Stuart Proctor at Richmond, Surrey in England. Godfrey left G.N. (Godfrey-Nash) to form H.R. Godfrey Motors, providing G.N. spares and rebuilds, which evolved into Godfrey and Proctor who both serviced GN's and produced their own car based on the Austin 7. About 10 cars had been produced when the company ceased trading in 1928.

Godfrey went on to found the HRG Engineering Company in 1935 and S.R.Proctor joined in 1950 as technical director, replacing original partner Guy Robbins.

See also
 List of car manufacturers of the United Kingdom

References 

 The Chain-Drive Frazer Nash by David A. Thirlby, MacDonald & Co. Ltd, 1965 
 Frazer Nash by David A. Thirlby, The Haynes Publishing Group, 1977 
 From Chain-Drive to Turbocharger: The A.F.N. Story by Denis Jenkinson, Patrick Stephens Limited, 1984

External links
Image of Jane Tomlinson competing in her Godfrey-Proctor at the 2012 Exmoor Fringe Trial organised by the Vintage Sports Car Club of Great Britain (VSCC). 

Defunct motor vehicle manufacturers of England
Defunct companies based in Surrey